Isaac Lee Hayes III (born June 10, 1975), also known as Ike Dirty, is an American record producer and voice actor who currently resides in Atlanta, Georgia. He is a son of late soul musician and actor Isaac Hayes.

Career
Hayes operates a production company called Chartcontrol and a publishing company called IKE Father IKE Son Music. He is known for producing the Lil Scrappy song "Money In The Bank" and the Ying Yang Twins song "Drop." He has also produced tracks for Redman, Keith Murray, Too Short, Blaque, Ruff Ryders, Black Coffey, Kurupt, Chris Robinson ("ATL" score), Jamie Foxx's Laffapalooza Comedy Central Special & DVD, Bohagon, Chamillionaire, Keke Palmer, Flash Freddy, Raz-B (former B2K band member), and J.R. on Universal Records/Grand Hustle.

Hayes has performed voice-over work for various companies such as the Atlanta Hawks, the Georgia Lottery, McDonald's, Publix, American Airlines, and Cadillac. He also voiced the character Broodwich for the animated adult television cartoon, Aqua Teen Hunger Force.

In addition, Hayes has performed vocals for the World Wrestling Federation in 2000, on California (the theme for WrestleMania 2000) and Bad Man (Rikishi's theme). Both songs appear on the compilation WWE Anthology.

References

External links 

Isaac Hayes's family aims to reclaim song rights

1975 births
Living people
Record producers from Georgia (U.S. state)
Place of birth missing (living people)
American male voice actors